Lewis Downing (1823 – November 9, 1872), also known by his Cherokee name ᎷᏫ ᏌᏩᎾᏍᎩ ("Lewie-za-wau-na-skie") served as Chief of the Cherokee Nation from 1867 to 1872. After the death of John Ross, he was a compromise candidate who was elected to a full term as Principal Chief. Downing worked to heal divisions in the tribe following removal to the Indian Territory and the American Civil War. He was elected to a second term in 1871, but died in 1872, after a two-week battle with pneumonia. The Cherokee Council chose William P. Ross as his successor.

Background
Downing was born in eastern Tennessee in 1823 to Samuel Downing and his wife Susan Daugherty, who were both Cherokee with mixed European ancestry, as were many among the leaders of the Nation in those years. The young Downing attended school at the Valley Town Mission in North Carolina.  When he was a young man, Downing and his family went west during the forced removal of the Cherokee and their slaves, now known as the Trail of Tears. The family was part of the emigration group led by Jesse Bushyhead.

In 1839, the Downings arrived in what is now Adair County, Oklahoma. They settled near the site where Reverend Evan Jones had reorganized the Baptist Mission after its removal from North Carolina. Lewis Downing continued his education at Baptist Mission.

Career
Early in life, Downing became a convert of the Mission through the efforts of Reverend Jones.  Downing subsequently was ordained as a Baptist minister. The historian John Bartlett Meserve wrote, "Reports of his [Downing's] spiritual activities reach back to 1842 when he was but nineteen years of age. On August 3, 1844, he was unanimously chosen pastor of the Flint Baptist Church, succeeding the Reverend Jesse Bushyhead who had died shortly before."

The young minister was a strong participant in Cherokee Nation politics and as such was elected senator from Goingsnake District on August 4, 1845. He later removed to a farm on what is today the southeast corner of Mayes County, Oklahoma, where he was elected to the senate on August 4, 1851, and again on August 1, 1859. In 1851, Downing served as a delegate from the Cherokee tribe to Washington, D.C.

Civil War
The American Civil War exacerbated divisions within the tribe dating to removal and the years of violence following that. Chief Ross agreed to an alliance with the Confederacy and the Cherokee formed the majority of the Indian cavalry. Lewis Downing was named chaplain of companies F and S of the 1st Cherokee Mounted Rifles, which was formed by Chief Ross for the Confederate Army on October 4, 1861. Col. John Drew was the commanding officer. The members of this regiment were mostly full bloods and were largely not slave owners, although Drew was a slave owner. The regiment fought in the Confederate service at Pea Ridge, Arkansas, on March 7–8, 1862.

With the advance of the Union forces into the Territory in July 1862, and the departure of Chief Ross for Philadelphia under growing tribal tensions, the cavalry's members began to waver in their allegiance to the South. With few exceptions, among them Col. John Drew, the Cherokee began to abandon Confederate service.  On July 11, 1862, at Flat Rock Creek, most joined the 3rd Regiment of the Indian Home Guards for service in the Union Army. This contingent was composed of three regiments consisting of 1,480 men, of which Lewis Downing was named Lieut. Colonel and the Rev. John B. Jones was designated its chaplain, in the brigade of Col. William A. Phillips.

At the time, the majority of the Cherokee favored the Confederacy.  They and those who were pro-Union formed dual governments in the Cherokee Nation, each striving to control its political affairs. The pro-Union forces, who recognized John Ross as chief, held meetings at Cowskin Prairie.  In July 1862, they renounced allegiance to the Confederacy.  Tom Pegg took over as acting chief, and their National Council in early 1863 reflected the Emancipation Proclamation of President Abraham Lincoln. On February 21, 1863, laws of were enacted and future slavery abolished. Lewis Downing assisted in leadership, serving as the third (in succession) acting principal chief of the Union Cherokee in John Ross' absence in Washington, D.C. The dual governments continued until after the conclusion of the war. The pro-Confederate Cherokee were led by Stand Watie, who served as a brigadier general in the Confederate Army.

Post war
Lewis Downing, as president of the pro-Union tribal council, went to Washington in 1863 to alert the government to the divided situation of the Cherokee.

After the war, a preliminary intertribal peace conference with the United States commissioners was held at Fort Smith on September 8, 1865. It was at this meeting that Downing protested against the refusal of the commissioners to accord recognition to John Ross as the Principal Chief of the Cherokee. At that time, Stand Watie was chief of the pro-Confederate Cherokee, and he proposed federal recognition of two Cherokee nations. The US dealt only with Ross and the pro-Union faction. 

Chief Ross returned to Tahlequah for a brief period in the fall of 1865.  He returned to Washington the next year to protest against the approval of section nine of the treaty of June 19, 1866.  The US government was requiring the Cherokee to free their slaves, and to grant them full citizenship in the Cherokee nation and equal rights to annuities and land grants as full-blood Cherokee. The Reverend John B. Jones approved this disputed section; he had accompanied Ross as a delegate and signed the treaty as such.

Becoming chief
John Ross died at Washington on August 1, 1866.  As Assistant Principal Chief, Lewis Downing succeeded him and served until an election on October 19, 1866. The National Council chose William P. Ross to fill the position of Principal Chief until the next election.

Much bitterness lingered among the Cherokee following the end of the war.   Many resented the conditions which the US government had included in the peace treaty, as the pro-Confederate Cherokee had wanted the government to remove the freedmen at its expense and to allocate them land separately from the Cherokee. Among the Ross faction of the pro-Union Cherokee were many who insisted upon the exclusion of the pro-Confederate Cherokee from tribal affairs. There were sentiments that the penalties for their Southern activities had not been entirely exhausted.

Downing opposed discrimination within the tribe. He formed the Downing Party to work for reunification of the different factions.  Reverend John B. Jones threw his power and influence among the full bloods, behind the Downing movement which was to rehabilitate the Southern Cherokees and align them with the Union Cherokee. In the tribal election held on August 5, 1867, Lewis Downing was elected Principal Chief with the support of both factions. The Downing party controlled the political affairs of the Cherokee Nation until Statehood in 1908, except for the tenure of chief Dennis W. Bushyhead from 1879 to 1887.

Lewis Downing signed the Treaty of April 27, 1869, at Washington.  He represented the Cherokee at Washington as a delegate in 1869 and in 1870. He was re-elected on August 7, 1871.

Family
Little information has been written about Lewis Downing's family life. Meserve says that he first married Lydia Price.  He and Lydia had three children: Samuel Houston, John Toyuneet, and Catherine Downing. After Lydia's death, he married Lucinda Griffin.  They had two children: Lewis James and William Downing. His third marriage was to Mary Eyre, a white widow whom he had met while he was in Washington. Mary moved to Tahlequah while Lewis' previous wife was still alive and married the old chief after her death. Both Lewis and Mary died about two years later. They had no children.

Death
He died in office at Tahlequah, on November 9, 1872, after a two-week battle with pneumonia, and is buried in the old Ned Adair cemetery in what is today Mayes County, Oklahoma. The Council was required to pick a successor to complete Downing's term. For unknown reasons, they turned to his old opponent, William Potter Ross.

Sources
McLoughlin, William G. After the Trail of Tears: The Cherokees' Struggle for Sovereignty 1839-1880. 1993. University of North Carolina Press. Chapel Hill.

References

Cherokee Confederates
Confederate States Army chaplains
Native Americans in the American Civil War
Baptist ministers from the United States
Pre-statehood history of Oklahoma
People of Indian Territory
People from Tennessee
1823 births
1872 deaths
Principal Chiefs of the Cherokee Nation (1794–1907)
People from Adair County, Oklahoma
Baptists from Oklahoma
19th-century American clergy